LS-1727 (also known as nandrolone 17β-N-(2-chloroethyl)-N-nitrosocarbamate) is a synthetic, injected anabolic–androgenic steroid (AAS) and a nitrosocarbamate ester of nandrolone (19-nortestosterone) which was developed as a cytostatic antineoplastic agent but was never marketed.

See also
 List of hormonal cytostatic antineoplastic agents
 List of androgen esters § Nandrolone esters

References

Abandoned drugs
Androgens and anabolic steroids
Antineoplastic drugs
Estranes
Hormonal antineoplastic drugs
Nandrolone esters
Nitrogen mustards
Organochlorides
Prodrugs
Progestogens
Chloroethyl compounds
Nitrosocarbamates